Bride Rovers GAA is a Gaelic games club located in the villages of Rathcormac and Bartlemy in east County Cork, Republic of Ireland. The club fields Gaelic football and hurling teams in Cork GAA and Imokilly GAA divisional competitions. They were runners up in the Cork senior hurling championship in 2008 to winners Sarsfields. The club colours are green white and yellow.

History
Bride Rovers was formed in 1928 when the two existing clubs in the parish Bartlemy and Rathcormac were amalgamated.

The club disbanded in 1950 following a series of "lean years", and for many years players in the community played for clubs in Bartlemy, for St Bartholomew's, or for other parish clubs. In December 1964, the Bride Rovers Club was reformed. The club went on to great success after being reformed winning the East Cork Junior B Championship in 1966. Seanie Barry won an All Ireland Senior and U21 medal with Cork in 1966. and the club then went on to win Two Junior A Titles in 1968 and 1969 and being one of the top clubs in the division throughout the 70s and played Erins own in what is regarded by many as the greatest East Cork Final in 1973, ending in a draw and being beaten in the replay. The club purchased its own ground in 1977 and opened Páirc na Bríde in June 1985
The club had lean times in the 80s but the 1990s saw a great young team emerge winning the East Cork B grade Double in 1993 and many of that team went on to win The County Junior A Title defeating Freemount in 1998. The Club History  "Bride Rovers Abu" written by club member John Arnold was published in the spring of 1999.
The team brought the club to Intermediate grade and in 2003 they won the County intermediate title defeating Inniscarra in the Final. This team went on to claim the Munster intermediate Title defeating Kilruane McDonaghs of Tipperary in the final. Senior Status was achieved for the club and five years later 2008 the team contested the Senior Hurling Championship Final v Sarsfields going down by the narrowest of margins in another epic encounter.  The club also won 3 East Cork Junior A Football Championships in 2004, 2007 and 2021. Brian Murphy won All Ireland Senior Medals with Cork in 2004 and 2005.In 2004 Brendan Walsh captained Cork to Munster and All Ireland Intermediate Hurling titles and Barry Johnson was also on Cork panel. Gerard Lane became the first club man to be elected to the County Board at Convention in December 2008 as PRO he subsequently was elected, Vice Chair and the Chairman in December 2014.

Honours
 Cork Senior Hurling Championship (0): (Runners-Up  2008)
 Cork Intermediate Hurling Championship (1): 2003 (Runners-Up 1933)
  Munster Intermediate Club Hurling Championship (1): 2003
 Cork Junior Hurling Championship (1): 1998
 Munster Junior Club Hurling Championship (1): 1998
 Cork Under-21 Premier 2 Hurling Championship (0): (Runners-up 2019)
 Cork Under-21 A Hurling Championship (1): 2018
 Cork Under-19 "A" Hurling Championship (1): 2022
 Cork Minor Hurling Championship (1): 1932 (Runners-Up 1933, 2021)
 Cork Premier 2 Minor Hurling Championship (1): 2018
 Cork Minor A Hurling Championship (1): 2017
 Cork Minor C Hurling Chamionship (1): 2013
 East Cork Junior A Hurling Championship (5): 1930, 1932, 1968, 1969, 1998
 East Cork Junior A Football Championship (3): 2004, 2007, 2021

Notable players
 Brian Murphy
 Barry Johnson
 Michael Collins
 Seánie Barry
 Brian Roche
 Eoin Roche

References

External links
Cork GAA site
Bride Rovers GAA site
Irish Examiner match report
Irish Examiner interview of Bride Rovers player

Gaelic games clubs in County Cork
Hurling clubs in County Cork
Gaelic football clubs in County Cork